Uí Failghe seems to have existed as a kingdom in Ireland since at least the early historic era, and successfully fought off encroachments by the Uí Néill, the Eóganachta, and most especially the Normans. From the mid eleventh century its dynasty adopted the surname Ua Conchobhair Failghe, or O Connor Faly (they were unrelated to the other notable Ua Conchobhair dynasties of Connacht and Kerry). Their seat was originally in Rathangan, County Kildare but moved to Daingean with the Norman arrival.

In the 1530s Brian supported the revolt of Silken Thomas; on his defeat he was pardoned and was given the title "Baron of Offaly".

On the death of the last de facto king, and de jure baron, Brian mac Cathaoir O Conchobhair Failghe, in about 1556, Uí Failghe was split between the modern day counties of King's County (Offaly), Queen's County (Laois) and County Kildare by Mary I of England during the Plantations of Ireland. Two Baronies in County Kildare, Offaly East and Offaly West, retained the anglicised name of the Kingdom. Upon Irish independence King's County was renamed as County Offaly.

Early kings

Failge Berraide (flourished 507-514)
Bruidge mac Nath Í (died 579)
Áed Rón mac Cathail (died 604)
Ailill mac Áedo Róin (died 639)
Cillíne mac Forannáin (died 652)
Fland Dá Chongal
Forbassach Ua Congaile (died 714)
Ailill Corrach mac Flainn (died 741)
Flaithnia mac Flainn (died 755)
Cummascach mac Flainn (died 757) 
Cináed mac Flainn (died 770)
Mugrón mac Flainn (died 782).
Domnall mac Flaíthnia (died 783)
Óengus mac Mugróin (died 803)
Flaíthnia mac Cináeda (died 806)
Cináed mac Mugróin (died 829)
 Mugrón mac Óengusa (d.842)
 Niall mac Cináeda (d.849)
 Máel Sinchill mac Mugróin (d.881)
 Conchobar mac Flannacáin (d.891)
 Uathmarán mac Conchobair (d.897)

Later kings c.1051-c.1556

Congalach Ua Conchobair, d. 1051
Gilla Patraic mac Conchobair Ua Sibleain, 1051-1071
Conchobar mac Congalaig, 1071-1115
Muirchertach, ?-1095
Rogan mac Domnaill meic Conchobair, 1115-c.1118
Cu Faifne mac Congalaig, c.1118-1130
Donnchad mac Con Faifne, 1130-1134
Aed mac Domnaill, 1134-????
Mael Morda mac Conchobair
Conchobair mac Con Faifne
Mael Sechlainn mac Conchobair
Congalach mac Con Faifne
Murchad mac Con Faifne
Muirchertach mac Muirchertaig (Int Athchlerch), ????-c.1151
Aed mac Donnchada (Gilla na Findmona), c.1151-1159
Domnall Ruad mac Congalaig, 1159-1161
Mael Sechlainn mac Congalaig, 1161-1164
Donchad Ruad Roigne, 1164-????
Diarmait mac Congalaig, 
Muirchertach mac Congalaig, ????-1169?
Diarmait mac Con Broga Ua Dimmusaig, after 1172-1193
Muirchertach mac Brian, fl. 1212
Mael Morda mac Muirchertaig meic Donnchada, ????-1225
Muirchertach mac Mael Morda, 1225-????
Muirchertach mac Muirchertaig, ????-c. 13 June 1305
Murchad mac Muirchertaig, 1305-????
Mael Sechlainn mac Muirchertaig, ????-1329
Muirchertach Óg mac Muircherartaig, ????-1384
Murchad mac Muircheartaig Óg, 1384-1421
Diarmaid mac Muirchertaigh Óg, 1421-c. 1425
An Calbhach Mór mac Murchada, c. 1425-1458 (see Máireg Béan Ó Conchubhair Fáilghe)
Conn mac an Chalbhaig, 1458-autumn 1474
Cathaoir mac Cuinn, 1474-1511
Brian mac Taidhg meic an Chalbhaigh, 1511-1517
An Calbhach mac Taidhg, 1517-c. 1525
Brian mac Cathaoir, c. 1525 - c. 1556 (created Baron Offaly in 1538; title forfeited in 1550)

See also
Irish kings
Gaelic Ireland

Footnotes

Sources
Book of Leinster: Section 28, Rig Hua Falge hosted by University College Cork CELT project.
"O'Connor Faly: O Conchobhair Failghe, Kings of Uí Failghe, a.1051-c.1556", page 217-18, "A New History of Ireland", volume nine, Oxford, 1984.
Mac Niocaill, Gearoid (1972), Ireland before the Vikings, Dublin: Gill and Macmillan
 Ger O'Connor BQMS

Ui Failghe